Qasr Khiar is a settlement of Murqub in Libya.

References 

Sahara
Baladiyat of Libya